"A Bushel and a Peck" is a popular song written by Frank Loesser and published in 1950. The song was introduced in the Broadway musical Guys and Dolls, which opened at the 46th Street Theater on November 24, 1950. It was performed on stage by Vivian Blaine and a women's chorus as a nightclub act at the Hot Box. It is the first of two nightclub performances in the musical. Although Blaine later reprised her role as Miss Adelaide in the 1955 film version of the play, "A Bushel and a Peck" was omitted from the film and replaced by a new song, "Pet Me, Poppa."

In the musical, the number can be performed either as "Miss Adelaide and her Chick Chick Chickadees," with the women  dressed in yellow feathers, or as "Miss Adelaide and the Hot Box Farmerettes," where skimpy farmer outfits are worn (often jean cutoffs and checkered racing shirts or short gingham sundresses). The script calls the dancers the Farmerettes and describes the costume as "abbreviated Farmerette costumes with large hats and carrying rakes, hoes and pitchforks". During the original production, the dancers wore large Daisy barrettes, with loose petals behind permanent ones. When they sang "He loves me, he loves me not," they would throw the loose petals into the audience.

A number of popular singers released recordings of "A Bushel and a Peck" while the show was still in rehearsals.

The most popular recording was by Perry Como and Betty Hutton, made on September 12, 1950, and released by RCA Victor. It reached the Billboard chart on October 21, 1950, and lasted 18 weeks, where it peaked at number 3.

Another popular contemporary recording, made the day after the Como-Hutton one, was by Margaret Whiting and Jimmy Wakely (recorded on September 13, 1950, and released by Capitol Records as Capitol 1042). The record reached the Billboard chart a week after the Como-Hutton version, on October 28, 1950, and lasted 15 weeks on the chart, peaking at number 6.

Doris Day's recording (also made on September 13, 1950, and released by Columbia Records as 78rpm catalog number 39008 and 45rpm catalog number 45-838) made the chart on November 4, 1950, for 8 weeks, peaking at number 16. Day's rendition of the song enjoyed a surge in popularity due to its usage in a 2017 State Farm Insurance TV commercial.

Other 1950 recordings that charted were by The Andrews Sisters, (Decca 27252) charting on December 9, charting for four weeks, peaking at number 22, and Johnny Desmond, (MGM 10800) charting the same day for one week at number 29.<ref>Whitburn, "Memories, pp. 29, 126</ref>

On December 9, all four recordings were on the Billboard chart.

On Cash Box's Best-Selling Record charts, where all versions of the song are combined, the song reached number 5 on December 2, 1950.

The song gained so much popularity before the musical actually opened that it was moved from its original spot at the start of the second act into the first act.

Recorded versions
The Andrews Sisters (1950)
Vivian Blaine (1953)
Perry Como and Betty Hutton (1950)
Doris Day (1950)
Johnny Desmond (1950)
Connie Haines (1950)
Frankie Laine and Jo Stafford (1953)
Margaret Whiting and Jimmy Wakely (1950)
Diahann Carroll "A" You're Adorable: Love Songs for Children (1965)
Sharon, Lois & Bram: From In The Schoolyard (1981) TV recording (1987)
VeggieTales: Junior's Bedtime Songs (2002)
Dan Zanes & Friends: Rocket Ship Beach'' (1990)
 Faith Prince Guys and Dolls 1992 Broadway Revival Cast Recording

References

1950 songs
Perry Como songs
Doris Day songs
Songs written by Frank Loesser
Songs from Guys and Dolls
Margaret Whiting songs
Jimmy Wakely songs